The parish church of Santa Maria Assunta in Filettole in the Italian region of Tuscany dates from the eleventh century. It was destroyed in the Second World War and rebuilt in 1958.

Location
The church is at Filettole, a village on the outskirts of Prato. It falls within the diocese of Prato.

History
The parish church has existed since the eleventh century. It was destroyed in Allied aerial bombardments in 1944. The church and bell tower were reconstructed by Sylvester Bardazzi on the basis of photographs taken before the bombing, using materials recovered from the ruins, and reopened in 1958.

Technical profile

Original structure
The church was characterized by a single nave ending in three apses. The façade was decorated with a pattern of architectural pilasters and arches in the roof eaves. The bell tower was coeval with the church and also repeated the decoration of hanging arches. The masonry of the church consisted of coursed rubble of limestone.

Current status
The modern church reproduces the ground plan of the ancient building. The façade, in the limestone cornice, is divided by thin pilasters into five bays, not reproducing the previous ornamental arches in the roof eaves. The central bay contains the neomedieval portal with archivolts, over which is a lunette covered with a sort of porch.

The left side - also made of limestone - is marked by four pilasters and pierced with mullioned windows. To the rear stands the bell tower (with a concrete structure), pierced by three orders of mullioned windows.

Contents
In the church is a marble baptismal font from the fifteenth century, in hexagonal shape, while in the sacristy is a fine wooden crucifix of the fifteenth century by Fr. Romualdo of Candeli.

References

External links
Photographs of the church, Massimiliano Galardi (Creative Commons licence)

Churches in the province of Prato
12th-century Roman Catholic church buildings in Italy
Romanesque architecture in Tuscany